= Veteran of the 1941–1945 War" Badge =

"Veteran of the 1941–1945 War" Badge is a commemorative badge of a unified sample established in honor of the 55th anniversary of the Victory in the Great Patriotic War of 1941–1945.

== Law on Approval ==
- "In honor of the 55th Anniversary of the Victory in the Great Patriotic War of 1941–1945"
- Decision on the Commemorative Badge of a Unified Sample "Veteran of the 1941–1945 War"

=== Law of the Republic of Azerbaijan ===
1. The decision "On the Commemorative Badge of a Unified Sample 'Veteran of the 1941–1945 War' in Honor of the 55th Anniversary of Victory in the Great Patriotic War of 1941–1945," signed in Yalta on October 8, 1999, is hereby approved.
